Andrzej Łukasik (born 1 September 1955 in Warsaw) is a Polish jazz double bassist and record producer.

Biography 
A former student of the Frederick Chopin Music Academy in Warsaw in the contrabass class of Professor Andrzej Mysiński, Łukasik began his jazz musician career in 1978, in the Kazimierz Jonkisz Quintet, where he played with Krzesimir Dębski, Andrzej Olejniczak and Janusz Skowron. The ensemble, with the same members, made a recording and took part in the 1980 Jazz Jamboree Festival in Warsaw. At the beginning of the 1980s, as a bass player, he was a recipient of an annual Krzysztof Komeda Prize musical scholarship. In 1984, together with Krzysztof Woliński, they received a commendation for their performance during the jazz festival in Hoeilaart (Belgium).

Over his career, Łukasik has collaborated with Polish jazz musicians such as Włodzimierz Nahorny, Henryk Miśkiewicz, Andrzej Jagodziński, Tomasz Szukalski, Andrzej Olejniczak, Paweł Perliński, Robert Majewski, Janusz Skowron, Maciej Strzelczyk, Krzesimir Dębski and Janusz Muniak.

Łukasik has worked with Włodzimierz Nahorny, Novi Singers, Kazimierz Jonkisz, Paweł Perliński, Andrzej Trzaskowski Polish Radio and Television Big Band, Project Grappelli and the Warsaw Paris Jazz Quintet. In 2004, with Janusz Szrom and Andrzej Jagodziński formed the group “Straszni Panowie Trzej”, which continues to perform.

Łukasik also collaborated with notable Polish artists (actors, writers, musicians) not involved with jazz music including, among others: Krzysztof Jakowicz, Andrzej Wróbel, Wojciech Młynarski, Jerzy Derfl, Krystyna Janda, Joanna Trzepiecińska, Zbigniew Zamachowski, Piotr Machalica, Artur Andrus, Andrzej Poniedzielski and Bogdan Loebl.

As an instigator, promoter and producer of many music projects, Łukasik oversaw the five year cycle of concerts entitled “Jazz, Powidła, Lasy”(later renamed “Warsaw Jazz Evenings”) emceed by the comedian, Artur Andrus, that presented the star vocalists of jazz including, among others: Ewa Bem, Lora Szafran, Iza Zając, Ewa Uryga, Andrzej Dąbrowski, Janusz Szrom, Marek Bałata, Krzysztof Kiljański, Marc Thomas, Miles Griffith, Monty Waters, Sibel Kose and many others.

Since 1994, he has owned and is operating a music production and promotion company “Blue Note Agencja Artystyczna” (Blue Note Artistic Agency) that organizes concerts and festivals and produces recordings of CDs.

Two of his albums received Gold Record status:” Straszni Panowie Trzej” (“The Three, Terribly Gentle Men”) and “Pogadaj Ze Mną” (“Talk to Me”) (both in 2009).

Selected discography

Jazz music ensembles 
 1980 – Tiritaka with Kazimierz Jonkisz Quintet – Polskie Nagrania
 1982 – XYZ with Kazimierz Jonkisz Quintet – Polskie Nagrania
 1984 – Purpurowa Bossa with Completorium – Polskie Nagrania
 1984 – Jazz Hoeilaart – Rainbow, Belgium
 1988 – Pryvilege with Marianna Wróblewska – Polskie Nagrania Muza
 1991 – Obejmij mnie – Polskie Nagrania
 1995 – Jobim with Maciej Strzelczyk – Polonia Records
 1997 – Kolędy with Marzena Ślusarska – Polonia Records
 1999 – Suita na wiolonczelę i trio jazzowe with Andrzej Wróbel – Acte Prealable
 2006 – Straszni Panowie Trzej with Janusz Szrom and Andrzej Jagodziński – Agora
 2007 – Cicho, cicho pastuszkowie with Włodzimierz Nahorny – Blue Note Artistic Agency
 2008 – Project Grappelli – Agora
 2008 – Pogadaj ze Mną – Agora
 2010 – Chopin Symphony Jazz Project with Warsaw Paris Jazz Quintet – Blue Note Artistic Agency
 2014 – Straszni Panowie Trzej 2 with Janusz Szrom and Andrzej Jagodziński – Blue Note

Other recordings 
 1980 – Nasza Basia Kochana – Polskie Nagrania
 1986 – Edyta Gepert Recital-Live – Pronit
 1989 – Gdzie się podziały tamte prywatki – Polskie Nagrania
 1995 – Róbmy Swoje’95 – Polskie Nagrania
 1996 – Młynarski Recital’71 – Polskie Nagrania
 1996 – Nobel’96 - Wisława Szymborska – Uniwersal Music, Poland
 1996 – Łucja Prus – Piosenki, Wisława Szymborska – Wiersze – Acord
 2007 – Ryś – EMI Music Poland

Album production and promotion 
 2006 – Straszni Panowie Trzej
 2007 – Cicho, cicho pastuszkowie
 2008 – Project Grappelli
 2008 – Pogadaj ze Mną
 2009 – Chopin/Jagodziński Sonata b-moll
 2010 – Chopin Symphony Jazz Project

Films and theatre

Music composer 
 1996 – Tajny Detektyw

Music  performance 
 1989 – Deja vu
 1994 – Oczy Niebieskie
 1996 - Tajny Detektyw
 1998 - Milena
 1998 - Dokument Podróży
 2000 - Kamienica na Nalewkach
 2001 - Poranek Kojota
 2003 - Magiczna gwiazda
 2007 - Ryś

Minor roles in movies 
 1996 – Pułkownik Kwiatkowski
 2001 – Poranek Kojota
 2003 – Tygrysy Europy

Bibliography 
 Straszni Panowie Trzej
 Cicho, cicho pastuszkowie | Wykonawcy
 Project Grappelli | Muzycy
 Pogadaj ze mną | Muzycy
 Chopin Warsaw - Paris Jazz Quintet | Muzycy
 Agencja Artystyczna Blue Note - Artyści
 FilmPolski.pl - Andrzej Łukasik

External links 

 Agencja Artystyczna Blue Note - Andrzej Łukasik

1955 births
Living people
Polish double-bassists
Male double-bassists
Polish jazz musicians
21st-century double-bassists
21st-century male musicians
Male jazz musicians